Sheridan Township is a township in Crawford County, Kansas, USA.  As of the 2010 census, its population was 1,451.

Geography
According to the USGS, it contains five cemeteries: Beulah, Cherokee, Meyers, Monmouth and Osage.

The streams of Grindstone Creek, Limestone Creek, Thunderbolt Creek and Wolf Creek run through this township.

References

 USGS Geographic Names Information System (GNIS)

External links
 City-Data.com

Townships in Crawford County, Kansas
Townships in Kansas